Daphnella thygatrica is a species of sea snail, a marine gastropod mollusc in the family Raphitomidae.

Description
The length of the shell attains 7 mm, its diameter 2.5 mm.

The small, fusiform shell is twisted. It is straw-coloured with faint rufous longitudinal tints. It contains seven whorls, of which three decussate whorls in the protoconch. The body whorl is doubly keeled. The  aperture is oblong. The outer lip is thin. The sinus is inconspicuous. The columellar margin is incrassate. The wide siphonal canal is only slightly produced.

Distribution
This marine species occurs in the Gulf of Oman

References

External links
 

thygatrica
Gastropods described in 1903